Qashqai Football Club (Persian: باشگاه فرهنگی ورزشی قشقایی, Bashgah-e Ferhengi-ye Vârzeshi-ye Qâshqâiye) or Qashqai Cultural Sport Club is a football club based in Shiraz, Iran. The club represents the Qashqai people of Iran, who are historically an ancient nomadic tribe.

Qashqai currently compete in the Azadegan League.

History
Qashqai Football Club was established in Shiraz in 2012 with the support of Qashqai Turk people living in Fars and other neighbor provinces of Iran. Qashqai F.C. was reputed since they as a second-tier club surprisingly knocked Persepolis football team out of Iran’s 2016–17 Hazfi Cup's 1/32 round on September 30, 2016. The two teams finished in a 1–1 draw after extra time and Qashqai defeated Persepolis 6–5 in penalty shootout.

On 30 September 2016, Qashqai produced one of the greatest ever shocks of the Hazfi Cup. Qashqai, a third-tier team defeated Iranian giants Persepolis on penalty kicks. This win advanced the club to the Round of 32 where they played New Bargh and lost 1–0.

Season-by-Season

First-team squad

Current Management Team

See also
 Tractor Football Club

References

Football clubs in Iran